The Staffan Stolle Story is a 1956 Swedish musical comedy film directed by Hasse Ekman. The film was selected as the Swedish entry for the Best Foreign Language Film at the 29th Academy Awards, but was not accepted as a nominee. The film stars Povel Ramel in a leading role, and features many scenes where Ramel performs musical numbers.

Cast
 Povel Ramel as Staffan Stolle
 Martin Ljung as Vicke Wickberg
 Gunwer Bergkvist as Tipsie Blink
 Yvonne Lombard as Charlotte Nibbing
 Hasse Ekman as Klad Traenger
 Sigge Fürst as Överste Nibbing
 Georg Funkquist as Fabiansson (as Georg Funkqvist)
 Siv Ericks as Fröken Lefverhielm
 Stig Järrel as Ulf Christer Lefverhielm
 Oscar Rundqvist as Sjungande badare

See also
 List of submissions to the 29th Academy Awards for Best Foreign Language Film
 List of Swedish submissions for the Academy Award for Best Foreign Language Film

References

External links
 
 

1956 films
1956 musical comedy films
1950s Swedish-language films
Swedish musical comedy films
Swedish black-and-white films
Films directed by Hasse Ekman
Films scored by Erik Nordgren
1950s Swedish films